was, prior to Canada (Minister of Citizenship and Immigration) v Vavilov, the leading Supreme Court of Canada decision on the topic of substantive review and standards of review. Dunsmuir is notable for combining the reasonableness (simpliciter) and the patent unreasonableness standards of review into a single reasonableness standard.

Facts
David Dunsmuir was hired by the Department of Justice of the Province of New Brunswick as of February 25, 2002. His work was unsatisfactory to his employer and he received multiple written notices to this effect. Ultimately, his employer decided to terminate his employment as of December 31, 2004. On August 19, 2004, Dunsmuir was informed in a letter that his employment was being terminated. As his employment was not being terminated "for cause," Dunsmuir was granted several months of paid leave with which to find a new job.

Dunsmuir grieved his dismissal in a letter sent to the Deputy Minister on September 1, 2004. When his grievance was denied, he gave notice that he would refer the grievance to adjudication. An adjudicator was selected by the agreement of both parties. The adjudicator held that Dunsmuir had been denied procedural fairness in the manner of his dismissal and that the dismissal was thus void ab initio. The adjudicator ordered Dunsmuir to be reinstated as of August 19, 2004. On judicial review to the Court of Queen's Bench, the decision was overturned. That decision eventually reached the Supreme Court of Canada.

History

Trial Court
The trial court took an application for judicial review and decided that the correct standard of review was correctness against the adjudicator's decision because the adjudicator did not have jurisdiction to inquire. The court decided that Dunsmuir received procedural fairness because of the hearing before the adjudicator and maintained the eight-month decision.

Court of Appeal
The Court of Appeal decided that reasonableness was the correct standard and that the adjudicator was unreasonable because the employer dismissed the employee at pleasure, and the common law rules did not require any more procedural fairness than Dunsmuir had received.

Decision

Statement of law
The Court began by canvassing the recent history of administrative law decisions on the standard of review, including Canadian Union of Public Employees, Local 963 v New Brunswick Liquor Corp, Crevier v Quebec (AG), Canada (Director of Investigation and Research) v Southam Inc and Pushpanathan v Canada (Minister of Citizenship and Immigration). The Court noted the general unworkability of the current state of the judicial review of administrative decisions in Canada. In response, the Court decided to dispense with having three standards of review: correctness, reasonableness (simpliciter), and patent unreasonableness. Instead, the court decided that there would be only two standards: correctness and reasonableness. Additionally, the decision to apply a correctness standard would no longer be based on "jurisdictional" issues.

The Court emphasized the use of precedent to simplify the issue of standard of review.  Firstly, courts must ascertain whether the jurisprudence has already determined in a satisfactory manner the degree of deference to be accorded with regard to a particular category of question. Secondly, if the first inquiry proves unfruitful, courts must proceed to an analysis of the factors making it possible to identify the proper standard of review:

The following matters were identified as being subject to the correctness standard:

Application to facts
When the new analytical framework was applied to the facts of Dunsmuir, the Court determined that the reasonableness standard was the correct approach on which to judge the administrative decision in question. In that regard, the Court ruled that the decision failed to meet that standard and was therefore unreasonable.

Impact
The ruling has consolidated the law relating to standards of judicial review in Canada and has effectively required a full standard of review analysis to be performed in all current disputes arising from administrative decisions. Dunsmuir does not stand for the proposition that the "adequacy" of reasons is a stand‑alone basis for quashing a decision or as advocating that a reviewing court undertake two discrete analyses: one for the reasons and a separate one for the result. It is a more organic exercise; the reasons must be read together with the outcome and serve the purpose of showing whether the result falls within a range of possible outcomes.

The Dunsmuir principles were subsequently clarified in Canada (Minister of Citizenship and Immigration) v Khosa, in which Binnie J commented:

However, Dunsmuir will not overrule specific requirements that are given in a statutory framework; therefore, the duty of procedural fairness will continue to apply in such cases.

The presumption of reasonableness in administrative review suggested by Binnie J in Dunsmuir did not find majority support at the time but has since been accepted by the Supreme Court in other cases. That presumption of reasonableness has since led to a more deferent view being taken by courts in Canada in reviewing administrative decisions.

In addition, the ruling has effectively ensured that most forms of public employment are best viewed through the lens of private employment law principles, irrespective of whether the affected person may be categorized as a public office holder. Therefore, appeals on grounds of procedural fairness will be available only to a few categories of public employment, and reinstatement procedures will occur even less frequently.

In June 2018, the Supreme Court found that the Canadian Human Rights Tribunal's determination that the Indian Act did not violate the Canadian Human Rights Act was reasonable. Three concurring justices argued that the context instead required review for correctness.

Notes

See also
List of Supreme Court of Canada cases

2008 in Canadian case law
Canadian administrative case law
Canadian constitutional case law
Canadian judicial review case law
Supreme Court of Canada cases